Alexis Hall may refer to:

 Alexis Hall (actress) (born 1980), British actress, singer and model
 Alexis Hall (writer), English author